Henry Thomas (born 1971) is an American actor.

Henry Thomas may also refer to:

Henri Joseph Thomas (1878–1972), Belgian painter, sculptor and etcher
Henri Thomas (1912–1993), French writer and poet
Henri Thomas (cyclist) (1905-1937), French cyclist
Henry Thomas (blues musician) (1874–1930?), American country blues singer and musician
Henry Thomas (athlete) (born 1967), former American high school sprinter
Henry Thomas (American football) (born 1965), former defensive tackle in the National Football League
Henry Thomas (suspected combustion death) (1907–1980)
Henry F. Thomas (1843–1912), U.S. Representative from Michigan
Henry Thomas (MP), UK MP from the Irish constituency of Kinsale, 1835–1837 and 1838–1841
Henry Thomas (boxer) (1888–1963), British Olympic boxer
Henry Thomas (miller) (1866–1928), owner of flour mill in South Australia
Henry Thomas (rugby union) (born 1991), English rugby union player
  (1834–1904), American draftsman
Henry Goddard Thomas (1837–1897), Union general in the American Civil War
Henry Haberfield Thomas (1886–1918), English aircraft designer
Henry James Thomas (born 1941), American civil rights activist
Henry Wirtz Thomas (1812–1890), Lieutenant Governor of Virginia
Henry T. Schnittkind (1888–1970), American author who wrote as Henry Thomas
Henry Dighton Thomas (1900–1966), geologist and academic at the University of Cambridge

See also
Harry Thomas (disambiguation)

Thomas Henry (disambiguation)